Amanda Hopkinson (born 1948) is a British scholar and literary translator.

Biography
She was born in London to the British journalist and magazine editor Sir Tom Hopkinson and photographer Gerti Deutsch. She gained a BA from the University of Warwick in 1970 and has a PhD from Oxford University.

During her academic career, Hopkinson has taught at City University, Manchester University, the University of East Anglia, the University of East London, Westminster University and Cardiff University. As a translator, she is best known for her English versions of contemporary Latin American literature. She has also translated several works by the French crime writer Dominique Manotti. In this work, she frequently collaborates with fellow translators Nick Caistor and Ros Schwartz.

Hopkinson is additionally a writer on photography. She has published monographs on Julia Margaret Cameron, Martin Chambi and Manuel Alvarez Bravo, and she has further written or edited a number of books on photography and photojournalism. She has also written the obituaries of numerous photographers for The Guardian  newspaper. Hopkinson lives in Norwich, and is married to fellow translator Nick Caistor.

Selected translations
 Carmen Posadas: Child's Play
 Claribel Alegría: Family Album
 Diamela Eltit: Sacred Cow
 Dolores Payas: Drink Time!: In the Company of Patrick Leigh Fermor
 Elena Poniatowska: Leonora
 Isabel Allende: The Japanese Lover
 Jose Saramago: Journey to Portugal
 Jose Saramago: The Notebook
 Paulo Coelho: The Devil and Miss Prym
 Ricardo Piglia:  Money to Burn
 Sergio Bizzio: Rage
 Lovers and Comrades: Women's Resistance Poetry from Central America
 Dominique Manotti: Affairs of State
 Dominique Manotti: Dead Horsemeat
 Dominique Manotti: Escape
 Dominique Manotti: Lorraine Connection

Works on photography
 150 Years of Photo Journalism
 Manuel Alvarez Bravo
 Martin Chambi
 Julia Margaret Cameron
 Between Ourselves: The Photographs of Mari Mahr
 Contemporary Photographers
 Desires and Disguises: Latin American Women Photographers
 Five Pioneers of Photography
 Hidden View: Images of Bahia, Brazil
 Photographs by Gerti Deutsch 1908–1979
 Rehearsal: Photographs of Dance
 Sixties London: Photographs by Dorothy Bohm

References

1948 births
Living people
British translators
Literary translators
British women writers
Historians of photography